Hit and miss may refer to:
 Hit & Miss, a 2012 British television series starring Chloë Sevigny
 Hit-and-miss engine, a type of internal combustion engine
 "Hit & Miss", a 1960 song by The John Barry Seven plus Four

See also 
 Hits and Misses (disambiguation)
 Hit or Miss (disambiguation)